Will Sawin is an associate professor of mathematics at Columbia University specialising in number theory and algebraic geometry and other areas. He was also a Clay Research Fellow in Clay Mathematical Institute. He earned his PhD degree from Princeton University in 2016 on "A Tannakian Category and a Horizontal Equidistribution Conjecture for Exponential Sums" under the supervision of Nick Katz. Will Sawin has found important applications of etale cohomology to theory of exponential sums over finite fields and also of classical counting techniques in analytic number theory in the study of cohomology in spaces which are of interest in algebraic geometry. He also contributes to the mathematical community in several ways including his regular posts in the MathOverflow website. Will Sawin was awarded the SASTRA Ramanujan Prize in 2021 for his contributions to the area of mathematics influenced by Srinivasa Ramanujan.

References

External links
 
 Official website

Recipients of the SASTRA Ramanujan Prize
Living people
Year of birth missing (living people)